Franjo Mraz (April 4, 1910 in Hlebine – October 26, 1981 in Brežice) was a notable Croatian artist. Together with Ivan Generalić and Mirko Virius, he is considered a founder of Croatian naive art. His most famous paintings are "Oranje" ("Ploughing") and "Zima" ("Winter").

Sources

 
 
 

1910 births
1981 deaths
People from Hlebine
People from the Kingdom of Croatia-Slavonia
Croatian naïve painters